Bob Thomas (February 14, 1926 – August 10, 2013) was an American businessman, newspaper columnist, and politician.

Born in Indianapolis, Indiana, Thomas served in the United States Army Air Forces 1944–1945. He then received his associate degree from Long Beach City College and his bachelor's degree from University of California, Los Angeles. He worked in electronic musical instruments and was corporate president. He served on the Carson City, Nevada school board and was president of the school board. Thomas served in the Nevada Assembly as a Republican 1982–1988. Thomas wrote a newspaper column in the Nevada Appeal.

Notes

1926 births
2013 deaths
Politicians from Indianapolis
Politicians from Carson City, Nevada
United States Army Air Forces personnel of World War II
Long Beach City College alumni
University of California, Los Angeles alumni
Businesspeople from Nevada
Republican Party members of the Nevada Assembly
School board members in Nevada
Writers from Indiana
Writers from Nevada
20th-century American businesspeople